Franz Ruff (1906 in Straubing – 1979 in Prien am Chiemsee) was a minor architect during the National Socialist regime in Germany, the son of Ludwig Ruff and responsible for completing the Nuremberg Party Congress Hall after his father's death in 1934. Along with Albert Speer, Paul Ludwig Troost and his father Ludwig Ruff, Ruff is one of the best-known architects of the 'Third Reich', who were entrusted with typical representative buildings and in this respect are considered to have set the style for this period. In 1944, Ruff was on the Gottbegnadeten list of the Reich Ministry for Popular Enlightenment and Propaganda.

See also
 Nazi architecture

References

External links
 Congress Hall

20th-century German architects
Architects in the Nazi Party
1906 births
1979 deaths
People from Straubing